is a railway station in Hirakawa, Aomori, Japan, operated by the private railway operator Kōnan Railway Company.

Lines

Station layout
Hiraka Station has a two opposed  side platforms with an elevated station building; however, one of the platforms has not been in use since the discontinuation of the Kuroishi Line in 1998. The station is staffed and also serves as the operational headquarters for the Kōnan Line.

Platforms

Adjacent stations

History
Hiraka Station was opened on September 7, 1927. Freight operations were discontinued in 1984. Wicket gate operation was turned over to a separate company (kan'i itaku) in October 1985. A new station building was completed in December 1986. On June 12, 2007, an accident occurred at Hiraka Station when a Kuroishi-bound train derailed.

Surrounding area
former Hiraka Town Hall
Hiraka Post Office

See also

 List of railway stations in Japan

External links
  
Location map 

Railway stations in Aomori Prefecture
Konan Railway
Hirakawa, Aomori
Railway stations in Japan opened in 1927